Events from the year 1799 in Russia

Incumbents
 Monarch – Paul I

Events

 Convention of Alkmaar

Births
 May 26 – Alexander Pushkin (d. 1837)

Deaths

References

1799 in Russia
Years of the 18th century in the Russian Empire